Taisiia Udodenko (born May 7, 1989) is a Ukrainian basketball player for Basketball Nymburk and the Ukrainian national team.

She participated at the EuroBasket Women 2017.

References

1989 births
Living people
Ukrainian women's basketball players
Sportspeople from Kharkiv
Power forwards (basketball)